Deepankudi  is a village in the Kudavasal taluk of Tiruvarur district in Tamil Nadu, India.

Demographics 

As per the 2001 census, Deepankudi had a population of 1,202 with 598 males and 604 females. The sex ratio was 1010. The literacy rate was 65.61.

References 

 

Villages in Tiruvarur district